Nirgua is a city and the seat of the Nirgua Municipality in the state of Yaracuy, Venezuela.

History
The city was founded on January 25, 1625, by Don Juan de Meneses.

References

Cities in Yaracuy
1625 establishments in the Spanish Empire
Populated places established in 1625